Kaizer Chiefs Football Club (often known as Chiefs) are a South African professional football club based in Naturena, Johannesburg South, that plays in the Premier Soccer League. The team is nicknamed AmaKhosi, which means "Lords" or "Chiefs" in Zulu, and the Phefeni Glamour Boys. Chiefs have won 13 league titles (four in the PSL era) and over 78 club trophies. As a result, they hold the most trophies amongst all clubs in South Africa and are the most successful team in South African football history since the start of the top flight in 1970. They are the most supported club in the country, drawing an average home attendance of 16,144 in the 2019–20 season, the highest in the league. The team plays its home matches at the 94,797-capacity FNB Stadium.

The team has a strong local rivalry with Orlando Pirates, a fellow Soweto team that Chiefs founder Kaizer Motaung played for in his early playing career. Famous players who donned the black-and-gold jersey in the past include former national team captains Neil Tovey and Lucas Radebe as well as Patrick Ntsoelengoe, Gary Bailey, John "Shoes" Moshoeu, Shaun Bartlett, Steve Komphela, Siyabonga Nomvete, and Doctor Khumalo.

The Kaizer Chiefs were banned by the African Football (CAF) from competing in African club competitions until 2009 after their abrupt withdrawal from the 2005 CAF Confederation Cup. This was the second time in four years that Chiefs had been penalized by CAF for refusal to participate in a competition.

It is the most supported team in sub-Saharan Africa. Kaizer Chiefs had a support base of over 16,000,000 at the turn of the century. Today, it is estimated at approximately 40,000,000 fans across Southern Africa, the majority of the fanbase in South Africa and neighbouring countries. In January 2020, Kaizer Chiefs celebrated their 50th anniversary.

Kaiser Chiefs, the British indie rock/britpop band, was named after the club because Lucas Radebe, a former player of Kaizer Chiefs, captained Leeds United, the team that the band members all supported.

History

Kaizer Chiefs were founded in January 1970 shortly after the return of Kaizer "Chincha Guluva" Motaung from the United States where he played as a striker for the Atlanta Chiefs of the North American Soccer League (NASL). He combined his own first name with the Atlanta Chiefs to create the name of Kaizer Chiefs. Several other people have played key roles in the formation and growth of Kaizer Chiefs, including the late Gilbert Sekgabi, Clarence Mlokoti, China Ngema, Ewert "The Lip" Nene, and Rabelani Jan Mofokeng, he trailed and quit because of work.

Kaizer Chiefs are known as "Amakhosi" by its fans, a Zulu word meaning "kings" or "chiefs". Their headquarters is Kaizer Chiefs Village, in Naturena, six kilometres south of Johannesburg.

The 2001–02 season was one of the Club's most successful in their history as well as their most tragic. They won four major trophies in four months; the Vodacom Challenge, the BP Top Eight, the Coca-Cola Cup, and the African Cup Winners' Cup. At the time the team was said to have been a team that was on "Operation vat alles" by its then public relations officer Putco Mafani, "vat alles" being an Afrikaans statement meaning "take everything" in English. However, the highs of cup wins was contrasted by the lows of the Ellis Park Stadium disaster on 11 April 2001, in which 43 fans were crushed to death during the Soweto Derby between Chiefs and their arch-rivals Orlando Pirates.

By winning the African Cup Winners' Cup, Chiefs played the 2001 CAF Champions League winners Al Ahly of Egypt in the 2002 CAF Super Cup. In April 2002, Kaizer Chiefs' achievements during 2001 were recognized as they were chosen as the "CAF Club of the Year" by the Confederation of African Football.

In the 2003–04 season Chiefs were given the Fair Play Award at the Peace Cup in South Korea. Chiefs ended the season as league champions, winning the PSL for the first time in their history.

During the championship race of the 2004–05 soccer season, Chiefs overtook the season-long leaders (Orlando Pirates) in the last game of the season to defend its PSL championship. Under the leadership of Romanian coach Ted Dumitru, Zambian striker Collins Mbesuma had a record-breaking season scoring 39 goals in all competitions.

Kaizer Chiefs' forays into Africa were temporarily scuttled by a Confederation of African Football (CAF) ban. However, it still made its presence felt through the annual Vodacom Challenge that pit Kaizer Chiefs and Orlando Pirates with an invited European club. Chiefs have won the Vodacom Challenge Cup 5 times since its inception. They beat a young Manchester United side 4–3 on penalties in the 2006 Challenge to win the trophy.

In March 2007, coach Ernst Middendorp and the club parted company. The club instantly appointed their rival Orlando Pirates' former coach Kosta Papić for the remainder of the 2006–07 season.

Muhsin Ertuğral returned for the 2007–08 season to begin his second stint with Chiefs, having already coached The Glamour Boys from 1999 until 2003.

On 26 June 2021, the team secured their first CAF Champions League final appearance after defeating Wydad AC by a 1–0 aggregate.

On 9 July 2021, Kaizer Chiefs confirmed through Twitter that they signed six players for next season after their transfer ban ended. On 17 July 2021, they lost 3–0 against Al Ahly in the Champions League Final.

Stadium

Amakhosi Stadium

During the past years, the Amakhosi have used no less than nine stadiums in Johannesburg as their home ground, and often rotated between several stadiums during the season. In August 2006, the club made a strategic decision to sign a "mutual interest agreement" with a stadium developer and the local municipality regarding the construction of a new permanent home venue for Kaizer Chiefs, at a total planned cost of R1.2 billion (£105m), which was to be partly owned by the club. This future home venue was named Amakhosi Stadium, and will be situated in Krugersdorp, roughly 40 km west of Johannesburg. Initially it was planned to open in December 2008, but according to the latest revised construction plan, it is now expected only to be finalised by August 2012. The planned stadium was redesigned into a cheaper project, with a new price tag at R700 million, and the capacity being reduced from 55,000 to 35,000 seats. As part of the new revised construction plan for the stadium, it was announced by Kaizer Chiefs, that they no longer plan to be one of the owners of the stadium, but remain ready to support the stadium as a long time committed tenant.

The new stadium was initially planned to be part of a greater sports precinct, into which the club would also move its entire "Kaizer Chiefs Youth Development Programme". The Gauteng Provincial Government have agreed to develop the needed infrastructures around the stadium, in order to guarantee sufficient road and railway access for the huge crowd of spectators.

The stadium developers initially had set time lines for the Amakhosi stadium, to open its doors for the public in December 2008. As of July 2010, construction however had not yet started. Kaizer Chiefs announced in August 2010, that construction of Amakhosi Stadium was now expected only to start in autumn 2010, and finalised by August 2012. It had been postponed several years, due to Kaizer Chiefs and its joint partners, facing difficulties to finance the construction. For the football seasons in 2010–12, the team instead planned to use Rand Stadium as their home venue.

Kaizer Chiefs however only played four of their 15 home games at Rand Stadium in 2010–11, due to some experienced capacity problems, with the transportation related infrastructures around the stadium -and a low spectator attendance. Instead the team during this season, played most of their home games, at the big FNB Stadium -Soccer City.

FNB Stadium/Soccer City

FNB Stadium is a stadium located in Johannesburg, with a capacity of 94,736 seats. It is located next to the South African Football Association headquarters (SAFA House), where both the FIFA offices and the Local Organising Committee for the 2010 FIFA World Cup is housed.

The Soweto Derby

The Soweto Derby between Kaizer Chiefs and Orlando Pirates is one of the most fiercely contested matches in world football, and in contrast to most other games in the South African Premier Soccer League, always attracts a large fanbase.

Honours

DOMESTIC

Top-flight League Titles (13)
Premier Soccer League
Champions (4): 2003–04, 2004–05, 2012–13, 2014–15
Runners-up (5): 1996–97, 1997–98, 1998–99, 2000–01, 2013–14, 2019–20

National Soccer League 
Champions (4) - record: 1989, 1991, 1992,1996 

National Professional Soccer League 
Champions (5) - record: 1974, 1977, 1979, 1981, 1984

Cups (41)
Nedbank Cup (National Cup)
Champions (13) - record: 1971, 1972, 1976, 1977, 1979, 1981, 1982, 1984, 1987, 1992, 2000, 2006, 2012–13

Telkom Knockout (League Cup)
Champions (13) - record: 1983,1984, 1986, 1988, 1989, 1997, 1998, 2001, 2003, 2004, 2007, 2009, 2010

MTN 8 (Top 8 Tournament)
Champions (15) - record: 1974, 1976, 1977, 1981, 1982, 1985, 1987, 1989, 1991, 1992, 1994, 2001, 2006, 2008, 2014

INTERNATIONAL
CAF Champions League
Runners-up: 2020–21

African Cup Winners' Cup
Winners: 2001

CAF Super Cup
Runners-up: 2002

Individual Awards
African Club of the Year 2001

Friendlies 
Vodacom Challenge
Winners (5) - record: 2000, 2001, 2003, 2006, 2009

Telkom Charity Cup
Winners (11) - record: 1986, 1987, 1988, 1989, 1990, 1994, 1996, 1998, 2002, 2003, 2010

Carling Black Label Cup
Winners(4): 2013, 2016, 2017, 2021 
Runners-up(5): 2011, 2012 , 2014, 2015 , 2019

 Sales House Champ of Champs
Winners: 1984

Ohlsson's Challenge Cup
Winners: 1987, 1989

Castle Challenge Cup
Winners: 1990, 1991

Stylo Cup
Winners: 1970

UCT Super Team Competition
Winners: 1972

Shell Helix Ultra Cup
Winners: 2019

Performance in CAF Competitions 
Kaizer Chiefs qualified to play for the 1997 African Cup Winners' Cup but withdrew from the competition. The team made their first CAF Cup appearance in the year 2000 and only made it to the round of 16. They had the same result in the 2005 CAF Champions League and 2014 CAF Champions League. In the 2018 edition of the CAF Confederations Cup, Kaizer Chiefs reached the playoff round of 30 in which they were eliminated. Kaizer Chiefs are the runner-ups of the 2020-21 CAF Champions League and the 2002 CAF Super Cup after being crowned the Champions of the 2001 African Cup Winners' Cup.

Kaizer Chiefs' appearances in African competitions

 CAF Champions league     = 5 appearance(s)
 CAF Confederations Cup   = 2 appearance(s) 
 CAF Super Cup                    = 1appearance(s) 
 African Cup Winners' Cup  = 3 appearance(s)
 CAF Cup                                = 1 appearance(s)

Crest and colours

Kit manufacturers and shirt sponsors

Club records
Most appearances –  Doctor Khumalo 497
Most goals –  Marks Maponyane 85
Most capped player –  Siphiwe Tshabalala 91
Most appearances in a season –  Neil Tovey 52 (1992)
Most goals in a season (all competitions) –  Collins Mbesuma – 35 2004/05
Record win – 9-1 vs Manning Rangers (Coca-Cola Challenge – 23 March 1996)
Record loss – 1-5 vs AmaZulu (League – 8/6/86), Orlando Pirates (League – 3/11/90)

Premier League era

Personnel

Club officials

Senior team staff

Current players

Out on loan

Notable former players
For all Kaizer Chiefs players with a Wikipedia article see 

PSL Era Kaizer Chiefs' all-time 'Best' eleven:

                    GK_Itumeleng Khune
                 
         CB_Patrick Mabedi    CB_Mohammed Ouseb
                 
   RB_Sizwe Motaung                     LB_Tsepo Masilela 
                    
                   DM_Tinashe Nengomasha
                 
                                  CM_Thabo Mooki
                 
              AM_Doctor Khumalo    
                 
 RF_Siyabonga Nomvete                     LF_Jabu Pule 
                    
                     CF_Pollen Ndlanya
Coach: 

Ted Dumitru

Subs: GK_Brian Baloyi; RB_Cyril Nzama; CB_Fabian McCarthy; CB_Tefu Mashamaite; LB_David Kannemeyer; DM_Patrick Mbuthu; CM_Reneilwe Letsholonyane; AM_John Moshoeu; LF_Siphiwe Tshabalala; RF_Knowledge Musona; CF_Collins Mbesuma

Coaches

 Thomas Johnson (1971)
 Thomas Johnson and  Kaizer Motaung (1972)
 Kaizer Motaung (1973–74)
 Eliakim Khumalo (1974)
 Eddie Lewis (1974–76)
 Eliakim Khumalo (1976)
 Thomas Johnson (1976)
 Eliakim Khumalo (1976)
 Eddie Lewis (1976)
 Kaizer Motaung (1977–78)
 Mario Tuani (1979–80)
 Eddie Lewis (1980)
 Chris Ngcobo (1981)
 Eliakim Khumalo (1981)
 Joseph Setlhodi (1982)
 Eddie Lewis (1983)
 Eliakim Khumalo and  Jackie Masike (1983)
 Orlando Casares (1983)
 Joe Frickleton (1984–85)
 Shaka Ngcobo (1985)
 Eddie Lewis (1985)
 Ted Dumitru (1985–88)
 Jack Chamangwana (1988)
 Jeff Butler (1988–89)
 Jack Chamangwana (1989)
 Augusto Palacios (1990)
 Jeff Butler (1991)
 Nelson "Teenage" Dladla (1991)
 Wiseman Mbale (1992)
 Jeff Butler (1992)
 Sergio dos Santos (1993)
 N. "Teenage" Dladla and  Ryder Mofokeng (1993)
 Geoff Hudson (1993)
 Philippe Troussier (1994)
 Trott Moloto (1994)
 Augusto Palacios (1995)
 Jeff Butler (1995–96)
 Walter da Silva (1996)
 Wellington Manyathi (1997)
 Paul Dolezar (1 July 1997 – 30 June 1999)
 Jacob Sephoa (1999)
 Muhsin Ertugral (14 July 1999–02)
 Doctor "16V" Khumalo and  Ace Khuse (2002–03)
 Ted Dumitru (12 June 2003 – 30 June 2005)
 Ernst Middendorp (1 July 2005 – 5 March 2007)
 Kosta Papić (7 March 2007 – 4 June 2007)
 Muhsin Ertugral (1 July 2007 – 8 May 2009)
 Vladimir Vermezović (18 May 2009 – 12 April 2012)
 Ace Khuse (interim) (12 April 2012 – 30 June 2012)
 Stuart Baxter (1 July 2012 – June 2015)
 Steve Komphela (17 June 2015 – 21 April 2018)
 Giovanni Solinas (12 July 2018 -7 December 2018)
 Ernst Middendorp (7 December 2018 – 9 September 2020)
 Gavin Hunt (17 September 2020 – 28 May 2021)
 Stuart Baxter (7 June 2021 – 21 April 2022)
 Arthur Zwane (26 May 2022 - Present)

Sponsors and partners
Shirt sponsor: Vodacom
Kit manufacturer: Kappa
Vehicle sponsor: Toyota
Bus sponsor: Protours
Channel: SuperSport
Beer: Carling Black Label
Healthcare: Medshield and Kaelo

Rugby
On 29 October 2012, Kaizer Chiefs announced that they had registered a rugby sevens team to participate in the inaugural 7s Premier League.

Notes

References

External links
Official website
PSL Club Info
Kaizer Chiefs results

 
Association football clubs established in 1970
Soweto
Premier Soccer League clubs
Soccer clubs in Johannesburg
1970 establishments in South Africa
African Cup Winners Cup winning clubs